Barbary Coast is a 1935 American historical Western film directed by Howard Hawks. Shot in black-and-white and set in San Francisco during the Gold Rush, the film combines elements of the Western genre with those of crime, melodrama and adventure. It features a wide range of actors, from hero Joel McCrea to villain Edward G. Robinson, and stars Miriam Hopkins in the leading role as Mary 'Swan' Rutledge. In an early, uncredited appearance, David Niven plays a drunken sailor being thrown out of a bar.

Plot
On a foggy night in 1850, Mary Rutledge and retired Colonel Marcus Aurelius Cobb arrive in San Francisco Bay aboard the clipper Flying Cloud. She had come to wed a wealthy owner of a gold mine, but he has lost his mine at the roulette wheel when the ball landed on red 13 times at the Bella Donna. The men at the wharf reluctantly inform her that her fiancé is dead, murdered most likely by Louis Chamalis, the powerful owner of the Bella Donna restaurant and gambling house. Mary is upset, but quickly pulls herself together.

Mary meets Chamalis and goes to work for him. Chamalis gives her the name "Swan" and showers her with extravagant gifts. Their relationship sours quickly because Swan is angered by Chamalis's destructive power-mongering. She does not, however, mind running a crooked roulette wheel and cheating the miners out of their gold.

Colonel Cobb purchases a printing press, with the intention of starting a respectable newspaper for the people of San Francisco. His first issue includes an article criticizing an unpunished murder by Chamalis and his men. When Chamalis finds out, he threatens to destroy Cobb's printing press and burn down the building, but is halted by Swan. Chamalis demands that Cobb never print anything attacking him. The colonel unwillingly complies.

Swan becomes disillusioned with her life in San Francisco. Her distant behavior irks Chamalis. One morning, she sets out on horseback. When it begins to rain heavily, she seeks refuge in a seemingly abandoned cabin, where she meets poet and gold miner Jim Carmichael. Swan is taken with him, but lies about her current situation after hearing his criticisms of the city. He gives her his book of poems as a memento.

Carmichael decides to return to New York. Because of fog, the ship will not leave for a few days. He meets Chamalis's helper, Old Atrocity, who, seeing his bags of gold is happy to show him to the Bella Donna. Carmichael is surprised to find Mary working there. He is served drugged liquor and plays roulette at her table. He loses his composure, insults Swan and eventually loses his money.

Carmichael wakes the following morning in the Bella Donna's kitchen. His eloquent speech impresses Chamalis, who hires him on the spot as a waiter. Carmichael's presence bothers Mary, who offers him money to depart. Carmichael refuses, wishing to earn the fare on his own.

Cobb puts up a poster telling about a murder Chamalis ordered and how the Bella Donna cheats customers. Seeing it, Chamalis's henchman "Knuckles" Jacoby shoots both the man who put it up and the publisher when he tries to defend him. Dying, Cobb orders his assistant to print the truth. Vigilantes hang Knuckles.

Devastated by Cobb's death, Mary acknowledges her love for Carmichael, and works the roulette table so that he wins back the gold he lost. Chamalis finds out and sets out to kill Carmichael. The lovers decide to leave together. They find a rowboat and attempt to board the ship in the harbor. They have trouble seeing in the fog, but can hear Chamalis pursuing them. He shoots and injures Carmichael, and corners them beneath a pier. Mary begs him, as proof of his love for her, not to kill Carmichael. Chamalis agrees, but tells her he does not want her anymore. The sheriff arrives with a mob, and Chamalis allows himself to be taken away. Mary returns to Carmichael's side aboard the ship as it prepares to set sail.

Cast
 Miriam Hopkins as Mary "Swan" Rutledge
 Edward G. Robinson as Luis Chamalis
 Joel McCrea as Jim Carmichael
 Frank Craven as Colonel Cobb
 Walter Brennan as Old Atrocity
 Brian Donlevy as Knuckles Jacoby
 Clyde Cook as Oakie
 Harry Carey as Jed Slocum
 Matt McHugh as Broncho
 Donald Meek as Sawbuck McTavish
 J.M. Kerrigan as Judge Harper
 David Niven as Drunken Sailor
 Rollo Lloyd as Wigham
 Heinie Conklin as Gambler (uncredited)
 Wong Chung as Ah Wing (uncredited)
 Harry Tenbrook as Henchman (uncredited)

Production
The film is based on the bestseller The Barbary Coast (1933) by Herbert Asbury. When the first draft of the script was submitted to Joseph Breen, he commented to Samuel Goldwyn that "The whole flavor of the story is one of sordidness, and low-tone morality."

After months of revisions by Ben Hecht and Charles MacArthur, the story changed from a story of an area of San Francisco where men came to find pleasure in drinking, prostitution, and gambling to a love story. Breen commented to Will Hays that it was now a love story "between a fine, clean girl" and a sentimental young man and that there was "no sex, no unpleasant details of prostitution" and contains "full, and completely compensating, value [...] the finest and most intelligent picture I have seen in many months".

Reception
Andre Sennwald of The New York Times found the film entertaining. Time felt it was "painfully uninspired". Scholastic, a magazine for youth recommended the film for its "authentic background and characters of the days of gold-discovery". Newsweek complained that the plot from the original book was thrown away. Canadian Magazine assured Canadians that the film had "nothing to do with the cheap, tawdry 'coast' " from the novel. Chicago threatened to ban the film. Goldwyn edited a few scenes, and the film was allowed to be exhibited there. The Chicago Legion of Decency condemned Barbary Coast. The Bishop of Los Angeles, John Cantwell, saw the movie with four other priests and enjoyed it; none found it immoral.

Writing for The Spectator in 1935, Graham Greene declared the film a triumphant success, describing it as "melodrama of the neatest, most expert kind, well directed, well acted and well written". Despite the film's use of what Greene regarded as a conventional plot, he lauded the "fresh and interesting" use of flawed characters to "make something real out of the hocus-pocus".

References
Notes

Bibliography
 Barbary Coast on Screen Guild Theater: June 24, 1946
 Diane Stevenson, "The Mixture of Genres in Two Films by Howard Hawks" in the Film and the Romantic special issue, Jeffrey Crouse (ed.), Film International, Vol. 7, No. 6, December 2009, pp, 24–31.

External links
 
 
 

1935 films
1930s historical films
1935 Western (genre) films
American black-and-white films
American Western (genre) films
Barbary Coast, San Francisco
1930s English-language films
Films scored by Alfred Newman
Films directed by Howard Hawks
Films set in 1850
Films set in San Francisco
Films set in the San Francisco Bay Area
Films about gambling
Samuel Goldwyn Productions films
Films about the California Gold Rush
Films with screenplays by Ben Hecht
Films with screenplays by Charles MacArthur
1935 drama films
1930s American films